Arthur Henry Collins (16 September 1902 – March 1974) was an English professional footballer who played as a goalkeeper in the Football League for Brentford.

Career statistics

References

1902 births
English footballers
English Football League players
Brentford F.C. players
1974 deaths
Sportspeople from Smethwick
Association football goalkeepers
Derby County F.C. players
Scarborough F.C. players
Mansfield Town F.C. players
Clay Cross Town F.C. (1874) players